Noureddin Alamouti (1901–1965) was an Iranian judge and politician. He served as the justice minister under the cabinet of Ali Amini, during which he was noted for forming a powerful anti-corruption division that led to "the last serious attempt to realize the rule of law" in Pahlavi dynasty.

Early life
He came from the rural district of Alamut. In 1919, he joined the Democrat Party and was imprisoned in 1923 for "agitating among the local peasantry". Alamouti was employed at the justice ministry during rule of Reza Shah.

Political career
One of the members of the "group of fifty-three", he was jailed in 1938. He later joined the Tudeh Party of Iran immediately after its establishment in 1941 and was elected to its provisional central committee. At the party's first congress in 1944, he was elected to the central committee and served as the party's general-secretary, a position he shared with Mohammad Bahrami and Iraj Eskandari.

He was listed by Tudeh for a Tehran seat in Iranian legislative election, 1943–1944, but was defeated. In 1946, Alamouti was excluded from the central committee because he was "not [a] full-fledged Marxist". He left the party in 1947 and joined the entourage of Ahmad Qavam. Alamouti was allegedly detested by Mohammad Reza Shah.

Ministry
Alamouti was appointed as the justice minister in 1961 and served in the capacity until July 1962. He launched a campaign to fight corruption and abuse of power among the ruling elite that led to jailing several high-ranking officials, including police chief general Alavi-Moghadam (charged with bribetaking), military prosecutor Hossein Azmoudeh and former plan and budget head Abolhassan Ebtehaj (charged with $69 million embezzlement). He appointed Ahmad Sadr Haj Seyyed Javadi as prosecutor of Tehran, who joined him in the anti-corruption legal activism. Among the military officers prosecuted during the period, were general Kia, Zarghami, Daftari, Khazaei and Nevissi. After he left office following resignation of Ali Amini, all detainees were released and the charges were dropped, however the effects of the activism were not forgotten. Three years later, some 100 judges were dismissed.

References

External links

1901 births
1965 deaths
20th-century Iranian politicians
20th-century Iranian judges
Iranian anti-corruption activists
Democrat Party (Persia) politicians
Central Committee of the Tudeh Party of Iran members
Democrat Party of Iran politicians
Co-General-Secretaries of the Tudeh Party of Iran
Ministers of Justice of Iran